The Venetian Twins (or "The two Venetian twins") is a 1747 play by Carlo Goldoni, based on Plautus's Menaechmi.

It was performed by Il Teatro Stabile of Genoa at the 1965 Edinburgh International Festival, directed by Luigi Squarzina and starring the celebrated Italian actor Alberto Lionello as the two twins. More recent productions include one at the Watermill Theatre and a 1993 production directed by Michael Bogdanov for the Royal Shakespeare Company.
  The play has also been adapted and staged as a 1979 Australian two-act musical comedy. The play was performed by Greene Shoots Theatre at the Edinburgh Fringe Festival at C Venues (main) in August 2010. Shakespeare & Company (Massachusetts) presented the play in English as part of its outdoor Bankside Festival, June 29-August 27, 2011, at Lenox, Massachusetts.

Main roles

Dr Balanzoni, a lawyer from Bologna in Verona
Rosaura, believed to be his daughter, later revealed as the sister of the twins
Pancrazio, friend of the doctor
Zanetto, twin brother of Tonino
Tonino, twin brother of Zanetto
Lelio, the doctor's nephew
Beatrice, Tonino's lover
Florindo, Tonino's friend
Brighella, servant in the doctor's house
Colombina, servant in the doctor's house
Arlecchino, servant of Zanetto
Tiburzio, goldsmith
Bargello

References 

1747 plays
Plays by Carlo Goldoni
Plays based on works by Plautus
Works based on Menaechmi